Marcelle Bühler (August 6, 1913 – June 24, 2002) was a Swiss alpine skier who competed in the 1936 Winter Olympics.

She was born in Uzwil.

In 1936, she finished tenth in the alpine skiing combined event.

References

External links
 Alpine skiing 1936 

1913 births
2002 deaths
Swiss female alpine skiers
Olympic alpine skiers of Switzerland
Alpine skiers at the 1936 Winter Olympics
20th-century Swiss women